Tell Ain Ghessali is an archaeological site 1.5km west of Rayak to Baalbek road near the Talia crossing in the Beqaa Mohafazat (Governorate). It dates at least to the Neolithic.

References

Chalcolithic sites of Asia
Baalbek District
Neolithic settlements
Archaeological sites in Lebanon
Great Rift Valley